Emmitsburg is a town in Frederick County, Maryland, United States,  south of the Mason-Dixon line separating Maryland from Pennsylvania.

Founded in 1785, Emmitsburg is the home of Mount St. Mary's University. The town has two Catholic pilgrimage sites: the National Shrine Grotto of Our Lady of Lourdes, which is on the campus of Mount St. Mary's, and the Basilica and National Shrine of St. Elizabeth Ann Seton, who was the first native-born United States citizen to be canonized as a saint. The Seton Shrine is one of the top eight Catholic pilgrimage destinations in the United States.

The National Emergency Training Center (NETC) campus is in Emmitsburg, located on the former campus of Saint Joseph College. The campus includes the Emergency Management Institute, the National Fire Academy and the National Fallen Firefighters Memorial.

The population as of the 2010 U.S Census was 2,814.

Emmitsburg is home to three Cal Ripken Baseball 12U 46/60 baseball championships. The titles were won in consecutive years (2013, 2014, and 2015). For years, the youth baseball and softball league was the gold standard in the Catoctin area.
 
The current mayor of Emmitsburg is Don Briggs.
The current commissioners are Frank Davis, T. J. Burns, Tim O'Donnell, Joseph Ritz III and Cliff Sweeney.

History
Emmitsburg was named for its founder, William Emmit, in 1785. However, a settlement (named first "Silver Fancy" and later "Poplar Fields") preceded the town, particularly since British authorities restricted colonists' expansion during and after the French and Indian War.

In 1757 Lutherans led by pastor George Bager built a church, which they shared with a German Reformed congregation until 1798. After the American Revolutionary War, Catholic missionary Rev. Jean Dubois established a mission church, then a seminary, at Emmitsburg. Later Elizabeth Ann Seton established a convent, with a school and hospital. Soon, the number of Methodists in Emmitsburg led to the formation of a circuit around town, rather than share a minister with Gettysburg, Pennsylvania.

The Union fortified Emmitsburg to stop the Confederate invasion of the Union territory in June 1863 during the American Civil War. Half the town was burned to the ground in a mysterious fire on the night of June 23. Folklore has it that "The Great Fire", as it was known, was started by a Union sympathizer to prevent advancing Confederates from taking supplies from the town. However fate spared the town a battle between the opposing forces, which instead took place 12 miles north of it in Pennsylvania near the town of Gettysburg. The town was briefly held by the retreating Confederates on July 4.

Geography
Emmitsburg is located at  (39.704697, −77.325294).

Climate

Emmitsburg has a humid continental climate (Köppen Dfa) with hot, humid summers and moderately cold winters. It is known for being located near the base of Catoctin Mountain.

Transportation

The primary method of travel to and from Emmitsburg is by road. U.S. Route 15 is the main highway serving Emmitsburg, providing connections northward to Gettysburg, Pennsylvania and southward to Frederick. U.S. Route 15 Business follows the old alignment of US 15 through the center of Emmitsburg, with the main highway now following a bypass on the east side of town. Maryland Route 140 is the other main highway traversing the town, which provides connections eastward towards Westminster and eventually Baltimore. To the west, MD 140 crosses into Pennsylvania and becomes Pennsylvania Route 16.

Demographics

2010 census
As of the census of 2010, there were 2,814 people, 997 households, and 670 families living in the town. The racial makeup of the town was 95.0% White, 2.0% African American, 0.2% Native American, 0.9% Asian, 0.7% from other races, and 1.3% from two or more races. Hispanic or Latino of any race were 2.5% of the population.

There were 997 households, of which 38.8% had children under the age of 18 living with them, 50.8% were married couples living together, 11.6% had a female householder with no husband present, 4.8% had a male householder with no wife present, and 32.8% were non-families. Of all households, 26.6% were made up of individuals, and 9.3% had someone living alone who was 65 years of age or older. The average household size was 2.64 and the average family size was 3.22.

The median age in the town was 39.5 years. 26% of residents were under the age of 18; 7.2% were between the ages of 18 and 24; 25.4% were from 25 to 44; 25.1% were from 45 to 64; and 16.3% were 65 years of age or older. The gender makeup of the town was 47.3% male and 52.7% female.

2000 census
As of the census of 2000, there were 2,290 people, 811 households, and 553 families living in the town. The racial makeup of the town was 97.16% White, 0.87% African American, 0.04% Native American, 0.31% Asian, 0.04% from other races, and 1.57% from two or more races. Hispanic or Latino of any race were 0.44% of the population.

There were 811 households, out of which 38.3% had children under the age of 18 living with them, 50.2% were married couples living together, 13.2% had a female householder with no husband present, and 31.7% were non-families. Of all households, 26.8% were made up of individuals, and 11.1% had someone living alone who was 65 years of age or older.  The average household size was 2.56 and the average family size was 3.03.

In the town, the population was spread out, with 24.4% under the age of 18, 6.7% from 18 to 24, 31.4% from 25 to 44, 16.6% from 45 to 64, and 20.8% who were 65 years of age or older.  The median age was 37 years. For every 100 females, there were 76.7 males.  For every 100 females age 18 and over, there were 70.0 males.

The median income for a household in the town was $38,710, and the median income for a family was $46,328. Males had a median income of $32,578 versus $23,235 for females. The per capita income for the town was $16,216.  About 4.2% of families and 12.9% of the population were below the poverty line, including 4.1% of those under age 18 and 44.4% of those age 65 or over.

Media

The town has two newspapers: the Emmitsburg News-Journal, and The Catoctin Banner, both of which are published monthly,

See also 
 Emmitsburg Historic District

References

External links

 Emmitsburg.net—Emmitsburg's non-profit community Web site
 Emmitsburg Historical Society's Web site
 Mount St. Mary's University
 Emmitsburg News-Journal—Emmitsburg's community newspaper

 
1785 establishments in Maryland
Catholic Church in Maryland
Catholic pilgrimage sites
Populated places established in 1785
Towns in Frederick County, Maryland
Towns in Maryland